Mylläri literally meaning "miller" is an occupational surname of Finnish language origin.

The surname may refer to:
, Finnish musician
Iisak Mylläri, Finnish wrestler

See also
Mylläri convention, in the game of bridge

Finnish-language surnames